Mirabeau is a commune in the Alpes-de-Haute-Provence department in southeastern France.

Geography
The Bléone forms the commune's southern border.

Natural and technological  risks
None of the department's 200 communes is in an area of zero seismic risk. The canton that Mirabeau belongs to, Digne-les-Bains-Ouest, is in zone 1b (weak seismicity), according to the deterministic classification of 1991, based on historical earthquakes, and in zone 4 (medium risk) according to the probabilistic classification EC8 of 2011. The commune of Mirabeau is exposed to three other natural hazards:
 forest fire
 flood (in the valleys of Les Duyes and La Bléone)
 ground movement: the commune is very concerned with this medium-to-high risk.

In addition, the commune of Mirabeau is exposed to a risk arising from the transport of dangerous materials by rail, road and pipeline. The railway line from Saint-Auban to Digne across the commune is no longer in use. For roads, National Route 85 can be used for the transport of dangerous goods. And a pipeline supplying natural gas to Digne crosses the commune and thereby constitutes an additional risk factor.

The commune's management plan for foreseeable natural hazards (PPR in French) was approved in 2008 for the risk of ground movement; there is no DICRIM (Dossier d’information communal sur les risques majeurs; that is, dossier of information for the commune on major risks).

The commune has seen several declarations of natural disaster: for an earthquake in 1984, flooding and mudslides in 1996 and 2001, droughts in 1989, 1990 and 1998, and for landslides in 1996. The only earthquake strongly felt in the commune occurred on 19 June 1984. Its intensity in Mirabeau was V on the Medvedev–Sponheuer–Karnik scale (MSK), i.e. sleeping people wake up, objects fall.  The epicentre of this earthquake was at Aiglun.

Population

See also
Communes of the Alpes-de-Haute-Provence department

References

Communes of Alpes-de-Haute-Provence
Alpes-de-Haute-Provence communes articles needing translation from French Wikipedia